Tim Blättler (born 4 September 1994) is a Dutch professional footballer who plays for RKSV Groene Ster as a forward.

Early and personal life
He is the nephew of former player Pierre Blättler, who also played for Roda JC. His younger brother Rick is also a footballer. His grandfather was a miner.

Career
Blättler played youth football for Roda JC, joining the club at the age of six. He left to play for KVC Oranje, and he later played amateur football for VV Chèvremont and EVV. In May 2015 he had had a two-week trial period with Fortuna Sittard.  He returned to Roda JC in June 2015, initially on an amateur basis. He made his debut for Roda JC in December 2015. At that time he was still working part-time in a sporting goods store.

Ahead of the 2019–20 season, Blättler joined RKSV Groene Ster.

References

1994 births
Living people
Sportspeople from Kerkrade
Dutch footballers
RKVV EVV players
Roda JC Kerkrade players
RKSV Groene Ster players
Derde Divisie players
Eredivisie players
Expatriate footballers in Germany
Association football forwards
FC Wegberg-Beeck players
Dutch expatriate footballers
Dutch expatriate sportspeople in Germany
Footballers from Limburg (Netherlands)